The Chanva is a river in Perm Krai, Russia, a left tributary of the Yayva. It begins at the confluence of rivers Tsenva and Rassokha, on the north slope of mountain range Bely Spoy. It is a mountain river with significant changes of elevation between source and mouth. It flows in a deep rocky valley. The mouth is downstream of the settlement Verh-Yayva. The most important of its tributaries, all small, are:
 Left: Kospash, Kostanok, Vetos, Stepanovka;
 Right: Anyusha, Berezovka.

Sources 
 Пермская область. Коми-Пермяцкий автономный округ: общегеогр. регион. атлас: сост. по состоянию на 1985-1997 гг.: масштаб 1:200000 : планы городов: Перми (1:50000), Кудымкара (1:20000) / ЦЭВКФ; ред. Ю. Кузнецов, Д. Трушин. 1-е изд. М.: ВТУ ГШ, 2000. 128 с.
 Ресурсы поверхностных вод СССР. Гидрологическая изученность. Т. 2: Средний Урал и Приуралье. Вып. 1: Кама / под ред. В. В. Николаенко. Л.: Гидрометеоиздат, 1966. 324 с., С. 69

References

Rivers of Perm Krai